Bridge Road is a major shopping strip in Melbourne, Australia. It is best known for its abundance of restaurants, cafes and shopping, which makes it a popular tourist attraction. The Richmond Town Hall and Epworth Hospital are amongst the landmarks of Bridge Road.

Route
Bridge Road begins at the intersection with Wellington Parade, Hoddle Street and Punt Road in Richmond and runs east through RIchmond as a four-lane, single-carriageway road for just over two kilometres, sharing surface tram tracks, until it crosses Church Street and widens slightly to allow trams a dedicated median in the centre of the road, then passes Richmond Town Hall. The road narrows back again to share tram tracks again just before its intersection with Yarra Boulevard, before crossing the Yarra River over the Hawthorn Bridge to its fork into Church Street and Burwood Road on the other side of the river.

Tram routes 48 and 75 pass along the entire length of Bridge Road.

History
Bridge Road is classified as a heritage area as its history dates back to 1837, two years after the European settlement of the colony of Victoria. The first land sales in the area took place on August 1, 1839.

Historical plaques are placed on many buildings and provide a glimpse into the development of Bridge Road.

The majority of the existing 19th-century buildings in Bridge Road are shops which date from the 1870s and 1880s. The horse-drawn omnibuses which brought shoppers to the area were replaced by cable trams in 1885, which in turn were replaced by an electrified tram service in 1916. Shortly afterwards Cinema Richmond opened in 1919 adjacent to the Town Hall.

Bridge Road was signed as Metropolitan Route 30 between Richmond and Hawthorn in 1965, sharing a short concurrency with Tourist Route 2 over the Hawthorn Bridge from 1989.

The passing of the Road Management Act 2004 granted the responsibility of overall management and development of Victoria's major arterial roads to VicRoads: in 2004, VicRoads re-declared Bridge Road (Arterial #5285) to begin from the Hoddle Highway (Hoddle Street and Punt Road) intersection in Richmond and end at Burwood Road in Hawthorn.

See also

References

External links
 http://www.bridgerd.com.au

Streets in Melbourne
Shopping districts and streets in Australia
Transport in the City of Yarra
Transport in the City of Boroondara